The Incheon SSG Landers Field is a baseball stadium located in Incheon, South Korea. Formerly named the Munhak Baseball Stadium, it is the home of the KBO League team SSG Landers. The stadium has been remodeled with Shinsegae affiliate brands, including Starbucks, No Brand Burger, and the convenience store e-mart 24. The SSG Landers Field has changed its main theme color to red and yellow, which represents the team's historical color used since the SK Wyverns. Also, the red color and yellow color respectively represent Shinsegae and e-mart as well.

The Stadium was serving as the filming location of SBS TV successful television series Hot Stove League that starred Namkoong Min. The stadium was used as the homebase of the central team of the series "Dreams" that has been hitting rock-bottom in the league until Namkoong came to help them.

SSG affiliate brands at Landers Field

Starbucks 
The Starbucks at SSG Landers Field is the first Starbucks ever to open inside a sports stadium. On April 3, 2021, Starbucks Korea released red reusable Starbucks cups that can only be purchased at the SSG Landers Field Starbucks. Starbucks Korea announced that they are planning to release more limited edition merchandise and develop special beverages and menus that are only available at SSG Landers Field.

No Brand Burger 
Shinsegae announced the opening of the 100th No Brand Burger branch in SSG Landers Field on May 7, 2021. It is located on the first floor, next to the first base side ticket booth. No Brand Burger in SSG Landers Field launched new special menus that are only available at the baseball stadium. They released the Landers Pack and Randy Pack which are respectively named after the team and team's mascot.

See also 
 List of baseball stadiums in South Korea

References

External links
SSG Landers Official Website

SSG Landers
Sports venues in Incheon
Baseball venues in South Korea
Venues of the 2014 Asian Games
Asian Games baseball venues
Sports venues completed in 2002
2002 establishments in South Korea